The Swedish Karting Championship is a karting racing event organized every year by Svenska Bilsportförbundet.

Formula Yamaha

Karting Formula 2

Senior 125 

Kart racing